Martin Place Historic District is a national historic district located at Franklin, Johnson County, Indiana. The district encompasses 27 contributing buildings 1 contributing structure, and 1 contributing object in an exclusively residential section of Franklin. It developed between about 1850 and 1935, and includes notable examples of Italianate, Queen Anne, American Foursquare, and Bungalow / American Craftsman style architecture.

It was listed on the National Register of Historic Places in 1987.

References

Historic districts on the National Register of Historic Places in Indiana
Italianate architecture in Indiana
Queen Anne architecture in Indiana
Historic districts in Johnson County, Indiana
National Register of Historic Places in Johnson County, Indiana